Stefano Ianni and Dane Propoggia were the defending champions but decided not to participate.
Marco Crugnola and Simone Vagnozzi won the title, defeating Guillermo Durán and Renzo Olivo 7–6(7–3), 6–7(5–7), [10–6] in the final.

Seeds

Draw

Draw

References
 Main Draw

Trofeo Stefano Bellaveglia - Doubles
2013 Doubles